Sven Morgan Andersson (23 February 1934, in Lundby, Göteborg – 4 July 1977, in Stockholm) was a Swedish actor.

Filmography

References 

1934 births
1977 deaths
Actors from Gothenburg
20th-century Swedish male actors